Trihexyphenidyl (THP,  benzhexol, trihex, marketed as Artane and others) is an antispasmodic drug used to treat stiffness, tremors, spasms, and poor muscle control. It is an agent of the antimuscarinic class and is often used  in management of Parkinson's disease. It was approved by the FDA for the treatment of Parkinson's in the US in 2003.

It is on the World Health Organization's List of Essential Medicines.

Medical uses 
Trihexyphenidyl is used for the symptomatic treatment of Parkinson's disease in mono and combination therapy. It is active in postencephalitic, arteriosclerotic, and idiopathic forms. The drug is also commonly used to treat extrapyramidal side effects occurring during antipsychotic treatment. It reduces the frequency and duration of oculogyric crises as well as of dyskinetic movements and spastic contractions.  Trihexyphenidyl may improve psychotic depression and mental inertia frequently associated with Parkinson's disease and symptomatic problems caused by antipsychotic treatment.

The drug cannot cure Parkinson's disease, but may provide substantial alleviation of symptoms. An estimated 50–75% of people with Parkinson's disease will react positively and experience a 20–30% symptomatic improvement. To increase therapeutic activity, trihexyphenidyl is often given concomitantly with levodopa or other antimuscarinic or antihistaminic (e.g. diphenhydramine) agents. Combination therapy with dopamine agonists such as cabergoline is also possible. This is often termed a 'multidimensional approach'. It has also been prescribed for essential tremor and akathisia.

Contraindications 
Contradindications include:
 Hypersensitivity to trihexyphenidyl
 Narrow angle glaucoma
 Ileus (disruption of the normal propulsive ability of the intestine)
 Caution: People with obstructive diseases of the urogenital tract, people with a known history of seizures and those with potentially dangerous tachycardia
 People under 18 years of age should not be treated due to a lack of clinical experience.
 People should allow a period to adjust to the dose when first starting trihexyphenidyl and when the dose has been increased or added to a regimen with other drugs because acute somnolence and accumulated fatigue can make it particularly dangerous to operate an automobile, heavy machinery etc.

Adverse effects 
Dose-dependent side effects are frequent, but typically lessen over time as the body adapts to the medication. All of the following symptoms considered, Artane has been shown to dramatically and consistently improve neurologic defects in people aged 16–86 over the course of five years. People who are older or who have psychiatric conditions may become confused or develop delirium. Side effects include but are not limited to:

 Central nervous system: drowsiness, vertigo, headache, and dizziness are frequent. With high doses nervousness, agitation, anxiety, delirium, and confusion are noted. Trihexyphenidyl may be abused due to a short acting mood-elevating and euphoric effect. The normal sleep architecture may be altered (REM sleep depression). Trihexyphenidyl may lower the seizure-threshold.
 Peripheral side effects: dry mouth, impaired sweating, abdominal discomfort, nausea, and constipation are frequent. Tachycardia or heart palpitations (fast heart rate) may be noted. Allergic reactions are rare, but may occur. Many of these peripheral symptoms, especially considering an acute increase in anxiety with various physical complaints, as well as evidence of orthostatic hypotension and tachycardia are indicative of withdrawal, especially in people with psychiatric conditions 
 Eyes: trihexyphenidyl causes mydriasis with or without photophobia. It may precipitate narrow angle glaucoma or cause blurred vision.
 Tolerance may develop during therapy which requires dose adjustments.
 Striated musculature and weight gain.

Trihexyphenidyl is a pregnancy category C drug. It is advised to only use with caution if benefits outweigh risks.

Overdose 

Trihexyphenidyl (THP) and other antiparkinsonian drugs are known to be substances of abuse. This is true both in abusers of other substances and in chronic schizophrenics, the latter being infrequent abusers of other drugs. Trihexyphenidyl mimics an atropine intoxication with mydriasis, dryness of mucous membranes, red face, atonic states of bowels and bladder, and hyperthermia in high doses. Central consequences are agitation, confusion, and hallucinations. An untreated overdose may be fatal, particularly in children. Premortal signs are respiratory depression and cardiac arrest. A specific antagonist is physostigmine which combines a peripheral and a central action. Carbachol can be used to treat atonic bowel and bladder. The vital functions should be monitored and stabilized. It may be necessary to treat hyperthermia with cooling blankets. Clinical case reports have repeatedly shown overdose of trihexyphenidyl alongside other substances.

Interactions 

 Other anticholinergic drugs (e.g. spasmolytics, antihistamines, TCAs) : Side effects of trihexyphenidyl may be increased.
 Quinidine : Increased anticholinergic action (particular on AV conduction).
 Antipsychotics : Long term use of trihexyphenidyl  may mask or increase the risk of tardive dyskinesia.
 Pethidine (meperidine) : Central effects and side effects of pethidine may be increased.
 Metoclopramide : Action of metoclopramide is decreased.
 Alcohol : Risk of serious intoxication.

Pharmacology 
The exact mechanism of action in parkinsonian syndromes is not precisely understood, but it is known that trihexyphenidyl blocks efferent impulses in parasympathetically innervated structures like smooth muscles (spasmolytic activity), salivary glands, and eyes (mydriasis). In higher doses direct central inhibition of cerebral motor centers may contribute. In very high doses central toxicity as seen in atropine overdose is noted. It binds to the M1 muscarinic receptor and possibly the dopamine receptor. Trihexyphenidyl is rapidly absorbed from the gastrointestinal tract. The onset of action is within 1 hour after oral dosing. The peak activity is noted after 2 to 3 hours. The duration of action of one single dose is 6 to 12 hours in a dose dependent manner. It is excreted in the urine, probably as unchanged drug. More precise data in animals and humans have so far not been determined.

History 
Artane, or its generic form Trihexyphenidyl HCL, was approved by the FDA on June 25, 2003 for the clinical use of all types of parkinsonism. However, it has been clinically relevant in trials pertaining to Parkinson's disease since 1949. Artane is an anticholinergic drug which is prescribed by doctors throughout the world. It is also abused, typically in combination with other drugs or delicate pharmaceutical agents. Prisons in Iraq were among the places where abuse was obvious, along with within communities of Iraqi soldiers.

Society and culture

Recreational use 
In a 2008 news report, trihexyphenidyl was seen to be used for recreational purposes among Iraqi soldiers and police, among other prescription drugs. The report states that the drugs were taken to relieve combat stress. Although that may be the case for some, others used Artane as a substitute or more intense version of LSD. This was especially prevalent in the 1960s, according to a report in "The New Yorker". Similarly to those in Iraqi forces, some of the appeal was that the individual may retain partial control while under the influence.

The neurologist Oliver Sacks reports using the drug recreationally in the 1960s. He recalled taking "a large dose" knowing full well the drug was intended for people with Parkinson's. More recounts of Dr. Sacks' experiences  including experimentation with mescaline, psilocybin, LSD, and probably DMT  have been compared in his book Hallucinations.

During the 1970s, trihexyphenidyl(trade name Parkan) was the most popular recreationally used prescription drug in Hungary.

Chemistry
Trihexyphenidyl can be synthesized in two ways, one linear and one convergent synthesis.

In the first way, the initial 2-(1-piperidino)propiophenone is synthesized in turn by the aminomethylation of acetophenone using paraformaldehyde and piperidine in a Mannich reaction. In the second step the 2-(1-piperidino)propiophenone is reacted with cyclohexylmagnesium bromide in a Grignard reaction.

Stereochemistry 
Trihexyphenidyl has a chiral center and two enantiomers. Medications are racemates.

Research
Equivocal preliminary results from small studies exist for:

 Other dyskinesias
 Huntington's chorea
 Spasmodic torticollis
 Dystonia

See also 
 Biperiden (bicyclic ring)
 Cycrimine (cyclopentanyl instead of cyclohexanyl)
 Gamfexine
 Procyclidine

References 

Tertiary alcohols
Muscarinic antagonists
1-Piperidinyl compounds
Cyclohexyl compounds